Lick Run is a tributary of Little Fishing Creek in Lycoming County and Columbia County, in Pennsylvania, in the United States. The entire drainage basin is considered to be a Coldwater Fishery and a portion of the stream is considered to be Class A Wild Trout Waters. At least one bridge crosses the stream.

Course
Lick Run begins in a valley in Jordan Township, Lycoming County. It flows nearly due south for almost a mile, in the process exiting Jordan Township and Lycoming County.

Upon exiting Lycoming County, Lick Run enters Pine Township, Columbia County. In this township, the stream turns south-southwest and its valley deepens. After nearly a mile, it crosses Pennsylvania Route 42 and turns nearly due south, flowing very closely parallel to Pennsylvania Route 42. The stream continues south for several miles, receiving a number of unnamed tributaries. It eventually turns south-southeast and crosses Pennsylvania Route 42. A short distance further downstream, the stream reaches its confluence with Little Fishing Creek.

Geography and hydrology

The concentration of alkalinity in Lick Run is 16 milligrams per liter.

Watershed
The stream is in the United States Geological Survey quadrangle of Lairdsville. The community of Sereno is in the vicinity of the stream.

History and etymology
Lick Run was entered into the Geographic Names Information System on August 2, 1979. Its identifier in the Geographic Names Information System is 1179300.

A prestressed box beam bridge carrying Pennsylvania Route 42 over Lick Run was built in 1987.

Lick Run is named after a natural salt lick in its vicinity.

Biology
Lick Run is considered by the Pennsylvania Fish and Boat Commission to be Class A Wild Trout Waters between its headwaters and the junction of T-645 and Pennsylvania Route 42. It is inhabited by brook trout. The stream is also considered to be a Coldwater Fishery throughout its entire drainage basin.

See also
West Branch Run, next tributary of Little Fishing Creek going downstream
Wolfhouse Run, next tributary of Little Fishing Creek going upstream
List of tributaries of Fishing Creek (North Branch Susquehanna River)

References

Rivers of Columbia County, Pennsylvania
Rivers of Lycoming County, Pennsylvania
Tributaries of Fishing Creek (North Branch Susquehanna River)
Rivers of Pennsylvania